Rick Perkins  (born November 4, 1961) is a Canadian politician who was elected to serve as the Member of Parliament for the riding of South Shore—St. Margarets in the 2021 Canadian federal election.

Background
Perkins holds an MBA from the Sobey School of Business at Saint Mary's University. He worked as a public servant before becoming a retail businessperson. He previously ran in Scarborough—Agincourt for the Progressive Conservatives in the 1997 Canadian federal election and in South Shore—St. Margarets for the Conservatives in the 2019 Canadian federal election.

Political career

44th Canadian Parliament (2021–present) 

In the 2021 Canadian federal election, Perkins defeated Liberal incumbent and Ministers of Fisheries, Oceans and the Canadian Coast Guard Bernadette Jordan.

On November 9, 2021, Perkins was named Shadow Minister for Fisheries, Oceans and the Canadian Coast Guard by Conservative Party leader Erin O'Toole. Upon assuming the role Perkins was appointed as Vice-Chair of the Canadian House of Commons Standing Committee on Fisheries and Oceans, as well as a member of the Subcommittee on Agenda and Procedure of the Standing Committee on Fisheries and Oceans.

Following O'Toole's ousting as party leader in February 2022, Perkins was reappointed as Shadow Minister for Fisheries by intern party leader Candice Bergen.

In March 2022, Perkins was one of 313 Canadian officials barred from entering Russia. The Russian ban was in response to new Canadian economic sanctions targeting Russian officials and entities following Russia’s invasion of Ukraine in late February. In response to ban, Perkins stated on social media that he would “wear this [ban] as a badge of honor” as he continues to stand in solidarity with the people of Ukraine.

During the 2022 Conservative Party of Canada leadership election Perkins endorsed hopeful leadership candidate Jean Charest and was further named co-chair of the campaigns national advisory board. Following Pierre Poilievre’s victory in the leadership race,  Perkins immediately congratulated him on becoming the new party leader. In a post-leadership interview with the National Post Perkins stated that the Conservative caucus was now “totally united” behind Poilievre despite what the tone of the leadership contest might have indicated."

Upon becoming the new leader, Poilievre kept Perkins on as the fisheries critic until October 12, 2022, until he was then replaced by Newfoundland MP Clifford Small. Perkins then became the Shadow Minister for Innovation, Science, and Industry, replacing former critic Ed Fast. Upon assuming the new critic position, Perkins was named Vice-Chair of the Canadian House of Commons Standing Committee on Industry and Technology, and was further appointed to the Subcommittee on Agenda and Procedure for the Standing Committee on Industry and Technology.

Political positions

2020 Mi'kmaq lobster dispute 

Perkins was an outspoken critic of Minister Bernadette Jordan's handling of the 2020 Mi’kmaq lobster dispute. Perkins called on her to respect the Supreme Court’s R v Marshall decision which stated that the Mi’kmaq treaty rights could be regulated and that the Mi'kmaq were not guaranteed an open season in the fisheries.

Jordan's handling of the dispute and subsequent criticism would play an important role in her electoral defeat. Tom Urbaniak an Associate Professor of Political Science at Cape Breton University, stated in an interview with Global News that that her handling of the fisheries concerns and subsequent controversy in the Mi'kmaq lobster dispute played the largest role in her electoral defeat.

After defeating Jordan in the 2021 Canadian federal election, Perkins stated in an interview with Global News that he would seek to "find a path forward that [would] bring everyone under the same set of rules and the same regulation through DFO."

Electoral record

References

External links

1961 births
Living people
Conservative Party of Canada MPs
Members of the House of Commons of Canada from Nova Scotia
People from Halifax, Nova Scotia
Saint Mary's University (Halifax) alumni
Businesspeople from Nova Scotia
Canadian businesspeople in retailing
21st-century Canadian businesspeople
21st-century Canadian politicians